John Donald may refer to:

John Stuart Donald (1861–1948), former Chief Commissioner of the North West Frontier Province of British India
John Donald (Wisconsin politician) (1869–1934), former Secretary of State of Wisconsin
John Donald (jewellery designer) (born 1928), British jeweller
John Donald (footballer) (born 2000), Spanish footballer
John Donald, academic book imprint of Birlinn

See also